The 2022–23 Wake Forest Demon Deacons men's basketball team represented Wake Forest University during the 2022–23 NCAA Division I men's basketball season. The Demon Deacons were led by third-year head coach Steve Forbes and played their home games at the Lawrence Joel Veterans Memorial Coliseum in Winston-Salem, North Carolina as members of the Atlantic Coast Conference.

Previous season
The Demon Deacons finished 2021–22 season 25–10, 13–7 in ACC play, to finish in fifth place. They lost to Boston College in the second round of the ACC tournament. They received an at-large bid to the National Invitation Tournament, where they defeated Towson and VCU in the first two rounds. Their season then ended in a quarterfinal loss to Texas A&M.

Offseason

Departures

Incoming transfers

2022 recruiting class

Roster

Schedule and results
Source:

|-
!colspan=12 style=| Exhibition

|-
!colspan=12 style=| Regular season

|-
!colspan=12 style=| ACC tournament

Rankings

*AP does not release post-NCAA tournament rankings^Coaches did not release a Week 2 poll.

References

Wake Forest Demon Deacons men's basketball seasons
Wake Forest
Wake Forest Demon Deacons men's basketball
Wake Forest Demon Deacons men's basketball